Anna-Maria Alexandri (born 15 September 1997) is an Austrian synchronized swimmer. She competed in the women's duet at the 2016 Summer Olympics, and 2020 Olympics.

She was born in Greece but in 2012 she moved to Austria. She has two more sisters and they are triplets, Eirini-Marina and Vasiliki Alexandri.

Career

Anna Maria was a member of the Greek National Team from 2010. She won gold medals in two Comen Cups on 2010, 2011 (age group 13-15) and she competed at the European Championships (senior category) on 2012 in Eindhoven at the age of 15 years old. In 2012 she moved to Austria, and in 2014 she acquired the Austrian nationality and represents Austria in synchronised swimming since then. She took part in the Junior World Championships in Helsinki in 2014, where she qualified for the finals and placed 7th in Solo and 9th in Duet with her sister. In 2015, she competed at the 1st European Games in Baku, where she won the silver medal in women's duet and the bronze medal in women's solo. With those two medals, Austria was placed 3rd in the medal table. Later that year, Anna Maria competed with her sisters in the senior category at the World Championships, where she qualified to the Finals in the women's technical duet.

In 2016, she competed at the European Championships in London, where she finished in 5th place.

References

2. https://www.bbc.com/sport/swimming/33132924

1997 births
Living people
Austrian people of Greek descent
Austrian synchronized swimmers
Greek synchronized swimmers
Naturalised citizens of Austria
Olympic synchronized swimmers of Austria
Synchronized swimmers at the 2016 Summer Olympics
Synchronized swimmers at the 2020 Summer Olympics
Swimmers from Volos
Synchronized swimmers at the 2017 World Aquatics Championships
European Games medalists in synchronised swimming
Synchronised swimmers at the 2015 European Games
European Games silver medalists for Austria
European Games bronze medalists for Austria
Artistic swimmers at the 2019 World Aquatics Championships
Greek emigrants to Austria
Artistic swimmers at the 2022 World Aquatics Championships
World Aquatics Championships medalists in synchronised swimming
20th-century Austrian women
21st-century Austrian women
European Aquatics Championships medalists in synchronised swimming
Triplets
Greek twins
Twin sportspeople